John Nevin may refer to:
 John Williamson Nevin, American theologian and educationalist
 John Anthony Nevin, American psychologist 
 John Joe Nevin, Irish boxer
 Jake Nevin, athletic trainer for Villanova University athletic teams

See also